Doamna Chiajna (1525–1588) was a Princess consort of Wallachia. She was married to Mircea the Shepherd. She was regent in Wallachia from 1559 to 1575.

She was born as Ana in Poland, the daughter of prince Peter IV Rareș, and married prince Mircea the Shepherd in 1545. She founded the first school in Romania, at Câmpulung, in 1552. After the death of her spouse in 1559, she became regent in Wallachia on behalf of her son, Peter the Younger. She is described as an energetic, intelligent and gifted politician. In 1575, she was abducted by the Ottomans and deported to Aleppo in Syria.

Last sourced report on 1588 and her resting place whereabouts remained unclear.

References
 Constantin Gane, "Trecute vieți de doamne și domnițe", vol 1

1588 deaths
16th-century women rulers
Regents and governors of Wallachia
16th-century Romanian people
Royal consorts of Wallachia
1525 births
Place of birth missing
16th-century Romanian women
People of the Principality of Moldavia
Royal consorts of Moldavia